Tortilia charadritis is a species of moth in the Stathmopodidae family. It is found from North Africa through the Middle East to western Pakistan. It is an introduced species in the eastern part of the United States.

The wingspan is 7–9 mm. Adults have a yellow head and forewings. There is a brown basal spot. The hindwings are shining greyish white. Adults have been recorded from May to July.

The larvae feed on the leaves of various Cassia, that have been imported to the United States from Sudan. Larvae have also been found on the fruits of various Ziziphus species.

References

Stathmopodidae
Moths of Africa
Moths of the Middle East
Moths of Asia
Moths described in 1924
Taxa named by Edward Meyrick